Radiator Springs Racers is slot car ride in Cars Land at Disney California Adventure. The attraction features a third-generation version of transport technology originally developed for the Test Track attraction at Epcot in Walt Disney World. Radiator Springs Racers is themed to the fictional world in Disney Pixar's Cars. At a cost of over $200 million, the attraction is the most expensive at Disneyland Resort and one of the most expensive theme park attractions in the world. It accounted for about 18% of the entire cost of the $1.1 billion expansion of Disney California Adventure Park. The attraction takes guests in a six-person vehicle through encounters with characters from the film series Cars. Guests then race another vehicle through turns and hills, ending with a randomized race result.

History
The attraction, along with the rest of the Disney California Adventure multi-year expansion, was announced on October 17, 2007. However, the first indication of the attraction and the new land was some concept art published in the Dreaming section of The Walt Disney Company's 2006 annual report. By late 2009, construction on the attraction and the land within it began, and was finished two and a half years later. At the "What's Next?" presentation at Disney California Adventure on June 11, 2010, Imagineer Kathy Mangum gave a brief rundown of the attraction's storyline. Ride testing began in early 2012 with soft openings the following spring. The ride officially opened to the public on June 15, 2012, with wait times of up to six hours. The line would stretch towards Paradise Pier, bypassing Cars Land.

Radiator Springs Racers was ranked second in the Amusement Today Golden Ticket Awards for best new ride for 2012.

Incidents 
On May 24, 2022, shortly after 8:30 PM PST, Radiator Springs Racers was closed down after a ride vehicle started emitting black smoke just before crossing the finish line of the ride, with guests yelling to be let off of the ride. As a result, the ride temporarily closed on May 24, 2022. An unknown Disneyland spokesperson says that the ride will remain closed indefinitely out of an abundance of caution, as work is likely being done on the ride vehicles.

Ride experience

Queue
The attraction's marquee is mounted on a large archway near the Radiator Springs courthouse. The queue passes through the archway and beneath two bridges before entering Stanley's Oasis, nestled between the cliffs of Ornament Valley. After winding through three of the town's earliest buildings, guests enter the Comfy Caverns Motor Court, where they board a convertible race car and the ride portion of the attraction begins.

Layout
Leaving the motor court, the vehicle takes an idyllic drive through Ornament Valley. It then enters the dark ride portion of the attraction as guests nearly run into several Audio-animatronic vehicles. This starts with a near head-on collision with Mack, followed by near-misses with Minny and Van, and narrowly making it over a grade crossing ahead of a speeding train. As the vehicle swerves out of the way, Sheriff appears, warning the guests to slow down and follow Mater into town for the big race. Along the way, Mater takes the ride vehicles "tractor tipping", but this awakens Frank the combine harvester, who angrily chases the trespassers off of his farm. The vehicle then reenters the town and passes Fillmore, Sarge, Lizzie, and Red before being greeted by Lightning McQueen and Sally Carrera. At this point, the track splits into two, and the ride vehicle will be directed to one of two scenes before lining up at the starting line. If the vehicle makes a left turn, it receives a tire change at Luigi's Casa Della Tires; if it makes a right turn, it gets a fresh coat of paint at Ramone's House of Body Art. Both tracks then pass Doc Hudson, who is dressed in his "Hudson Hornet" livery and introduces himself as the guests' new crew chief. Once two ride vehicles have arrived at the starting line, an enthusiastic Luigi waves the flag to signal the start of the race.

During a short drop down a sloped bank, an on-ride photo is taken. One of the two vehicles (selected at random) reaches the finish line slightly earlier, bringing the race to an end. The vehicles then enters Taillight Caverns, where Lightning and Mater congratulate both vehicles on a great race. The ride vehicles then merge back onto a single track and return to the boarding station.

See also

Test Track, the namesake of the Test Track technology, located at Epcot.
2012 in amusement parks
Journey to the Center of the Earth, the second generation of Test Track technology, located at Tokyo DisneySea, near Tokyo, Japan.

References

External links
 

Amusement rides introduced in 2012
Amusement rides manufactured by Dynamic Structures
Audio-Animatronic attractions
Cars Land
Disney California Adventure
Pixar in amusement parks
Walt Disney Parks and Resorts attractions
2012 establishments in California